Kondhawali is a town in Satara District, near Mahabaleshwar  in Maharashtra, India.

It is considered as the birthplace of Jiva Mahale (bodyguard of Empire Shiwaji Maharaj).

Population is around 700-800 Peoples. It is surrounded by the Krishna River from 2 sides.

Special Highlights :-
1.kamalgad
2.Krishna River
3.Ram krishna hari ashram

Temples
There Are 5 Major temples in the village 
Shree Bhairavanaath Temple  
Hanuman Temple 
Shree Datta Mandir
Siddheshwar Mandir
Gorakshanath Mandir

Cities and towns in Satara district